Giuseppe Zaniboni (born 13 March 1949 in Stagno Lombardo) is a retired Italian professional footballer who played as a defender.

Honours
Juventus
 Serie A champion: 1972–73.

1949 births
Living people
Italian footballers
Serie A players
U.S. Cremonese players
Atalanta B.C. players
Juventus F.C. players
Mantova 1911 players
A.C. Cesena players
Association football defenders